A Master in International Affairs (MIA), Master in Global Affairs (MGA), Master in International Relations (MIR), or Master of International Policy and Practice (MIPP), is a professional master's degree in international affairs.

Subject matter
Details can vary between degree-granting institutions, but an MIA typically includes:
 Interstate relations
 Forms of Government
 Diplomacy
 Sociology
 Political Philosophy
 Defence policy
 International law
 International relations
 International Political Economy
 International History
 International finance
 Economics and economic policy
 Functional concentrations
 Regional concentrations
 Foreign languages
 Electives

APSIA
The Association of Professional Schools of International Affairs is an association of schools of international affairs. Its members are schools and departments from the United States, Canada, Europe, and Asia.

See also
 Master of International Business
 List of master's degrees

References

External links
 Graduate Program in International Affairs at Graduate Institute of International and Development Studies
 School of Government, LUISS Guido Carli
 School of International Relations, St. Petersburg State University, Russia

Master's degrees